CGS Tajuddin is a Leader Class offshore patrol vessel of the Bangladesh Coast Guard. She is serving the Bangladesh Coast Guard since 2017.

History
The ship was laid down on 16 October 1989 at Fincantieri and launched at 15 September 1990. She was commissioned to the Italian Navy as an ASW corvette named Sibilla (F 558) at 16 May 1991. In 2015, she was decommissioned from the Italian Navy and sold to the Bangladesh Coast Guard. Then the ship has gone through extensive refit at Fincantieri where it was converted to an offshore patrol vessel. All sensors and armaments were removed from the ship and replaced by the Bangladesh Coast Guard requirements.

Career
Tajuddin was handed over to the Bangladesh Coast Guard on 5 August 2016. She left Italy for Bangladesh on 3 September 2016 and reached Chittagong, Bangladesh on 2 November 2016. She was commissioned to the Bangladesh Coast Guard on 12 January 2017.

CGS Tajuddin visited India from 7 February to 17 February 2017 on a goodwill mission. She visited the Goa port of India from 7 February to 11 February 2017. During her stay at Goa, the ship participated in 10th Regional Co-operation Agreement (ReCAP) for safe and secure sea 2017 exercise. Then she visited the Chennai Port of India from 14 February to 17 February 2017.

CGS Tajuddin left Chattogram on 22 May 2018 for a goodwill visit to India. She reached Chennai Port of India on 25 May 2018 and stayed there till 28 May 2018. She then reached the Visakhapatnam Port of India from 29 May 2018. The ship came back home on 4 June 2018.

See also
 List of ships of the Bangladesh Coast Guard
 CGS Syed Nazrul
 CGS Mansoor Ali
 CGS Kamruzzaman

References

Ships of the Bangladesh Coast Guard
1990 ships
Ships built by Fincantieri
Ships built in Italy